The atomic radius of a chemical element is a measure of the size of its atom, usually the mean or typical distance from the center of the nucleus to the outermost isolated electron.  Since the boundary is not a well-defined physical entity, there are various non-equivalent definitions of atomic radius. Four widely used definitions of atomic radius are:  Van der Waals radius, ionic radius, metallic radius  and covalent radius. Typically, because of the difficulty to isolate atoms in order to measure their radii separately, atomic radius is measured in a chemically bonded state; however theoretical calculations are simpler when considering atoms in isolation. The dependencies on environment, probe, and state lead to a multiplicity of definitions.

Depending on the definition, the term may apply to atoms in condensed matter, covalently bonding in molecules, or in ionized and excited states; and its value may be obtained through experimental measurements, or computed from theoretical models. The value of the radius may depend on the atom's state and context.

Electrons do not have definite orbits nor sharply defined ranges. Rather, their positions must be described as probability distributions that taper off gradually as one moves away from the nucleus, without a sharp cutoff; these are referred to as atomic orbitals or electron clouds. Moreover, in condensed matter and molecules, the electron clouds of the atoms usually overlap to some extent, and some of the electrons may roam over a large region encompassing two or more atoms.

Under most definitions the radii of isolated neutral atoms range between 30 and 300 pm (trillionths of a meter), or between 0.3 and 3 ångströms. Therefore, the radius of an atom is more than 10,000 times the radius of its nucleus (1–10 fm), and less than 1/1000 of the wavelength of visible light (400–700 nm).

For many purposes, atoms can be modeled as spheres. This is only a crude approximation, but it can provide quantitative explanations and predictions for many phenomena, such as the density of liquids and solids, the diffusion of fluids through molecular sieves, the arrangement of atoms and ions in crystals, and the size and shape of molecules.

History

In 1920, shortly after it had become possible to determine the sizes of atoms using X-ray crystallography, it was suggested that all atoms of the same element have the same radii.  However, in 1923, when more crystal data had become available, it was found that the approximation of an atom as a sphere does not necessarily hold when comparing the same atom in different crystal structures.

Definitions

Widely used definitions of atomic radius include:

 Van der Waals radius: In the simplest definition, half the minimum distance between the nuclei of two atoms of the element that are not otherwise bound by covalent or metallic interactions.  The Van der Waals radius may be defined even for elements (such as metals) in which Van der Waals forces are dominated by other interactions.  Because Van der Waals interactions arise through quantum fluctuations of the atomic polarisation, the polarisability (which can usually be measured or calculated more easily) may be used to define the Van der Waals radius indirectly.

 Ionic radius: the nominal radius of the ions of an element in a specific ionization state, deduced from the spacing of atomic nuclei in crystalline salts that include that ion. In principle, the spacing between two adjacent oppositely charged ions (the length of the ionic bond between them) should equal the sum of their ionic radii.
 Covalent radius: the nominal radius of the atoms of an element when covalently bound to other atoms, as deduced from the separation between the atomic nuclei in molecules. In principle, the distance between two atoms that are bound to each other in a molecule (the length of that covalent bond) should equal the sum of their covalent radii.
 Metallic radius: the nominal radius of atoms of an element when joined to other atoms by metallic bonds.
 Bohr radius: the radius of the lowest-energy electron orbit predicted by Bohr model of the atom (1913).  It is only applicable to atoms and ions with a single electron, such as hydrogen, singly ionized helium, and positronium.  Although the model itself is now obsolete, the Bohr radius for the hydrogen atom is still regarded as an important physical constant.

Empirically measured atomic radius

The following table shows empirically measured covalent radii for the elements, as published by J. C. Slater in 1964. The values are in picometers (pm or 1×10−12 m), with an accuracy of about 5 pm. The shade of the box ranges from red to yellow as the radius increases; gray indicates lack of data.

Explanation of the general trends
The way the atomic radius varies with increasing atomic number can be explained by the arrangement of electrons in shells of fixed capacity.  The shells are generally filled in order of increasing radius, since the negatively charged electrons are attracted by the positively charged protons in the nucleus.  As the atomic number increases along each row of the periodic table, the additional electrons go into the same outermost shell; whose radius gradually contracts, due to the increasing nuclear charge.  In a noble gas, the outermost shell is completely filled; therefore, the additional electron of next alkali metal will go into the next outer shell, accounting for the sudden increase in the atomic radius.

The increasing nuclear charge is partly counterbalanced by the increasing number of electrons, a phenomenon that is known as shielding; which explains why the size of atoms usually increases down each column. However, there is one notable exception, known as the lanthanide contraction: the 5d block of elements are much smaller than one would expect, due to the weak shielding of the 4f electrons.

Essentially, the atomic radius decreases across the periods due to an increasing number of protons. Therefore, there is a greater attraction between the protons and electrons because opposite charges attract, and more protons create a stronger charge. The greater attraction draws the electrons closer to the protons, decreasing the size of the particle. Therefore, the atomic radius decreases. Down the groups, atomic radius increases. This is because there are more energy levels and therefore a greater distance between protons and electrons. In addition, electron shielding causes attraction to decrease, so remaining electrons can go farther away from the positively charged nucleus. Therefore, the size, or atomic radius, increases.

The following table summarizes the main phenomena that influence the atomic radius of an element:

Lanthanide contraction

The electrons in the 4f-subshell, which is progressively filled from lanthanum (Z = 57) to ytterbium (Z = 70), are not particularly effective at shielding the increasing nuclear charge from the sub-shells further out. The elements immediately following the lanthanides have atomic radii which are smaller than would be expected and which are almost identical to the atomic radii of the elements immediately above them. Hence lutetium is in fact slightly smaller than yttrium, hafnium has virtually the same atomic radius (and chemistry) as zirconium, and tantalum has an atomic radius similar to niobium, and so forth.  The effect of the lanthanide contraction is noticeable up to platinum (Z = 78), after which it is masked by a relativistic effect known as the inert pair effect.

Due to lanthanide contraction, the 5 following observations can be drawn:

 The size of Ln3+ ions regularly decreases with atomic number. According to Fajans' rules, decrease in size of Ln3+ ions increases the covalent character and decreases the basic character between Ln3+ and  OH− ions in Ln(OH)3, to the point that Yb(OH)3 and Lu(OH)3 can dissolve with difficulty in hot concentrated NaOH. Hence the order of size of Ln3+ is given:  La3+ > Ce3+ > ..., ... > Lu3+.
 There is a regular decrease in their ionic radii.
 There is a regular decrease in their tendency to act as a reducing agent, with an increase in atomic number.
 The second and third rows of d-block transition elements are quite close in properties.
 Consequently, these elements occur together in natural minerals and are difficult to separate.

d-block contraction

The d-block contraction is less pronounced than the lanthanide contraction but arises from a similar cause. In this case, it is the poor shielding capacity of the 3d-electrons which affects the atomic radii and chemistries of the elements immediately following the first row of the transition metals, from gallium (Z = 31) to bromine (Z = 35).

Calculated atomic radius
The following table shows atomic radii computed from theoretical models, as published by Enrico Clementi and others in 1967. The values are in picometres (pm).

See also
Atomic radii of the elements (data page)
Chemical bond
Covalent radius
Bond length
Steric hindrance
Kinetic diameter

Notes
 Difference between empirical and calculated data: Empirical data means "originating in or based on observation or experience" or "relying on experience or observation alone often without due regard for system and theory data". In other words, the data are measured through physical observation, and vetted by other experiments generating similar results. Calculated data, on the other hand, are derived from theoretical models. Such predictions are especially useful for elements whose radii cannot be measured experimentally (e.g. those that have not been discovered, or that have too short of a half-life).

References

Atomic radius
Properties of chemical elements